Dame Alison Mary Roxburgh  (née Cameron; 6 September 1934 – 25 January 2020) was a New Zealand women's rights advocate and community leader.

In the 1986 New Year Honours, Roxburgh was appointed a Companion of the Queen's Service Order for public services, and in 1993 she received the New Zealand Suffrage Centennial Medal. In the 1995 New Year Honours, she was made a Commander of the Order of the British Empire, for services to women's affairs. She was appointed a Distinguished Companion of the New Zealand Order of Merit, for services to women's affairs and the community, in the 2003 Queen's Birthday Honours. Following the restoration of titular honours by the New Zealand government in 2009, Roxburgh accepted redesignation as a Dame Companion of the New Zealand Order of Merit.

References

1934 births
2020 deaths
People from Nelson, New Zealand
University of Otago alumni
New Zealand women's rights activists
Companions of the Queen's Service Order
Recipients of the New Zealand Suffrage Centennial Medal 1993
New Zealand Commanders of the Order of the British Empire
Dames Companion of the New Zealand Order of Merit
New Zealand justices of the peace